Trump Mediaeval (also German Trump Mediäval) is an old-style serif typeface designed by Georg Trump.  It was released in 1954 both by the C. E. Weber foundry as metal type and Linotype for hot metal typesetting.  

Despite a common association with blackletter typefaces, the mediaeval name refers to the German typographical term for roman typefaces dark in color like the old style Venetian typefaces.

Prominent examples of its use include the 1975 Gotteslob and the A Song of Ice and Fire novels.

Digital variants
 Trump Mediaeval, Linotype
 Trump Mediäval, Adobe
 Kuenstler 480, Bitstream

References

External links
 

Old style serif typefaces
Adobe typefaces
Linotype typefaces
Letterpress typefaces
Digital typefaces
Typefaces and fonts introduced in 1954
Typefaces designed by Georg Trump